In differential geometry, the slice theorem states: given a manifold M on which a Lie group G acts as diffeomorphisms, for any x in M, the map  extends to an invariant neighborhood of  (viewed as a zero section)  in  so that it defines an equivariant diffeomorphism from the neighborhood to its image, which contains the orbit of x.

The important application of the theorem is a proof of the fact that the quotient  admits a manifold structure when G is compact and the action is free.

In algebraic geometry, there is an analog of the slice theorem; it is called Luna's slice theorem.

Idea of proof when G is compact 
Since G is compact, there exists an invariant metric; i.e., G acts as isometries. One then adopts the usual proof of the existence of a tubular neighborhood using this metric.

See also
Luna's slice theorem, an analogous result for reductive algebraic group actions on algebraic varieties

References

External links
 On a proof of the existence of tubular neighborhoods
 

Theorems in differential geometry